The Pirate of Panama is a 1929 American action film serial directed by Ray Taylor. The film is considered to be lost.

Cast
 Jay Wilsey (aka Buffalo Bill Jr.) as Karl
 Natalie Kingston as Evelyn Wallace
 Al Ferguson as Boris Bothwell
 George Ovey
 Mary Sutton as Aunt Berry
 Otto Bibber as Teager

Episodes
The serial had a total of 12 episodes, with the first 3 being released on the same day, and the others being slowly released for the next few months.

 Pirate Gold
 Mutiny
 The Treasure Chest
 The Pirates' Secret
 Vengeance
 Trapped by the Tide
 The Shadow of Death
 The Menacing Swamp
 The Signal of Hope
 Two Lives for One
 The Price of Greed
 The Greatest Treasure

See also
 List of film serials
 List of film serials by studio

References

External links

1929 films
1920s action adventure films
American silent serial films
American black-and-white films
American action adventure films
Films directed by Ray Taylor
Lost American films
Universal Pictures film serials
1920s American films
Silent action adventure films
1920s English-language films